KIKD (106.7 FM, "Kick 106.7") is an FM radio station based in Carroll, Iowa. The station plays Country music. KIKD is part of Carroll Broadcasting, along with KKRL and KCIM.

History 
KIKD-FM signed on the air on St. Patrick's Day, 1996, under the ownership of the Betty Baudler Horras of Ames Broadcasting Company, owner of KCCQ-FM, and KASI-AM as well as a company that produces vinyl signs.  On February 4, 1999, a bid was made for KIKD-FM from Carroll Broadcasting Company, owners of KKRL-FM and KCIM-AM.  Later, KIKD's studios were moved from the corner of Highway 30 and Clark Street in Carroll to 1119 East Plaza Drive in Carroll. At the time of the bid, KIKD-FM and KCIM-AM were both country music stations. Later KCIM was forced to change its format. Neal Trobak, the Program Director at the time of the buyout, said, "I assume we will go to an easy-listening format of some kind, compatible with the age of the people that listen to us". KIKD was originally an automated Hot Country station under the direction of Bob Foster. In 1999, the station began using local hosts during the daytime hours 6 a.m.-10a.m. In 2000, KIKD extended their local hosts to 6 a.m.-6 p.m., then once again in 2008 from 5 a.m.-7 p.m.

On-air staff and programming 
KIKD's current morning announcer is Kristin Campisi. Other current announcers (as of July 2012) include Renie Osterlund, and Tiffini Young.  The station airs shows dedicated to country music and is currently an affiliate of Westwood One.

References 

 Heman B (1999) Carroll Broadcasting Co. announces bid for KIKD Daily Times Herald 02/04/1999 pp 1.
 Jones Radio Network, Jones Radio.com, accessed February 19, 2006
 FCC Documentation, FCC.gov, accessed February 19, 2006
 FCC Documentation, FCC.gov, accessed February 19, 2006

External links 
 Kick 106.7 Website
 Carroll Broadcasting

Country radio stations in the United States
IKD